Urbain Mbenga Mpiem Ley is a leader in the Community of Christ. He is the president of the church's First Quorum of the Seventy.

Biography
Mbenga was born in Mamou, Guinea. He emigrated to the Democratic Republic of the Congo (DRC) and was educated at a school in Kananga and at universities in Kinshasa. Mbenga went on to teach high school in Beno and was a high school principal in Kinshasa. He later became the head of the geography department at the Université Pédagogique Nationale in the DRC.

As president of the First Quorum of the Seventy, Mbenga oversees the Community of Christ's Africa and Haiti Mission Field.

External links
Community of Christ: Who are the seventy?, cofchrist.org

Democratic Republic of the Congo members of the Community of Christ
Democratic Republic of the Congo religious leaders
Guinean emigrants to the Democratic Republic of the Congo
Guinean members of the Community of Christ
Guinean religious leaders
Community of Christ leaders
Democratic Republic of the Congo schoolteachers
Guinean schoolteachers
Living people
Year of birth missing (living people)